J.K.K. Munirajah College of Technology, also called JKKMCT, located at Gobichettipalayam in the Erode District in the state of Tamil Nadu, India, is a private self-financing engineering institute. The college is approved by AICTE and is affiliated with the Anna University Coimbatore. The college was established in the academic year 2008-2009 and governed by the Annai J.K.K.Sampoorani Ammal Charitable Trust.

Courses offered
The college offers three courses leading to the Degree of Bachelor of Engineering (B.E.) and one course leading to Bachelor of Technology (B.Tech.) of the Anna University Coimbatore.

Admission procedure

Students are admitted based on their 12th standard (higher secondary school) scores. The admissions are done as per the Government of Tamil Nadu norms through State Government Counselling and through regulated management seat procedures.

References 

All India Council for Technical Education
Engineering colleges in Tamil Nadu
Colleges affiliated to Anna University
Universities and colleges in Erode district
Education in Gobichettipalayam
Educational institutions established in 2008
2008 establishments in Tamil Nadu